Sir Richard Andrew Snowden, PC (born 22 March 1962), styled Lord Justice Snowden, is a Lord Justice of Appeal.

Biography 
Snowden was educated at Downing College, Cambridge, and Harvard Law School. He was called to the bar at Lincoln's Inn in 1986, and elected a Bencher in 2010. He was appointed a Queen's Counsel in 2003, a Recorder in 2006, and a Deputy High Court Judge in 2008. He was a member of the Insolvency Rules Committee between 2002 and 2012. He also edited several works on company and insolvency law.

Snowden was appointed a Justice of the High Court (Chancery Division) on 30 April 2015, following the elevation of Mr Justice Sales to the Court of Appeal, and received the customary knighthood the same year.

On 19 September 2019, Snowden took on the role of Vice-Chancellor of the County Palatine and became Supervising Judge of the Business and Property Courts for the North and North-Eastern Circuits following Mr Justice Barling's retirement.

On 31 August 2021, it was announced that Snowden would be promoted to the Court of Appeal. He was appointed to the Privy Council on 15 December 2021.

Arms

References 

1962 births
Lords Justices of Appeal
Members of the Privy Council of the United Kingdom
English King's Counsel
21st-century King's Counsel
Alumni of Downing College, Cambridge
Harvard Law School alumni
Knights Bachelor
Living people